Judicial Service Commission may refer to:
 Judicial Service Commission (Bangladesh)
 Judicial Service Commission (Botswana)
 Judicial Service Commission (Fiji)
 Judicial Service Commission (Kenya)
 Judicial Service Commission (Maldives)
 Judicial Service Commission (Nepal)
 Judicial Service Commission (Somalia)
 Judicial Service Commission (South Africa)
 Judicial Service Commission (Sri Lanka)
 Thailand
 Administrative Court Judicial Service Commission
 Court of Justice Judicial Service Commission
 Judicial Service Commission (Uganda)